Kopplin is a surname. Notable people with the surname include:

Björn Kopplin (born 1989), German football player 
Gail Kopplin (1939–2021), American politician and school administrator
Zack Kopplin (born 1993), American political activist, journalist, and television personality